Thomas Anthony Durkin is a criminal defense attorney in Chicago. He specializes in civil rights and domestic terrorism cases.

Durkin graduated from Chicago's Leo Catholic High School in 1964 and received a Bachelor of Arts degree from the University of Notre Dame in 1968. He attended the University of San Francisco School of Law from 1970 to 1973, and received the degree of Juris Doctor in June 1973.  From April, 1978, to March, 1984, he served as an Assistant United States Attorney for the Northern District of Illinois under United States Attorneys Thomas P. Sullivan and Dan K. Webb. Since September 2010, he has been a Graduate Student at Large and a Returning Scholar at the University of Chicago.

Durkin has been admitted by the U.S. Department of Defense to The Pool of Qualified Civilian Defense Counsel to Practice Before the Military Commissions, and presently serves on the National Association of Criminal Defense Lawyer's Select Committee on National Security. He also serves as a member of the Advisory Committee of the Center for Civil and Human Rights of the University of Notre Dame Law School. Durkin continues to serve as a panel attorney for the Federal Defender Program, Inc., for the United States District Court for the Northern District of Illinois in Chicago; and is a member of the National Association of Criminal Defense Lawyers, the American Bar Association's Committees on Criminal Justice and International Law, the Illinois State Bar Association's Human Rights Section Council and the Union League Club of Chicago's Public Affairs Subcommittee on the Administration of Justice.

Durkin is a fellow of the American College of Trial Lawyers. He also teaches National Security Law, and is the Distinguished Practitioner in Residence at Loyola University Chicago School of Law, where he serves as Co-Founder and Co-Director of its National Security and Civil Rights Program.

Durkin's pro bono efforts to defend several Guantanamo Bay detainees have attracted national attention.

Durkin was selected in 2008 to be a participant in the John Adams Project, a joint effort of the American Civil Liberties Union and the National Association of Criminal Defense Lawyers to provide  civilian defense counsel to assist the military lawyers in the trial of the five High Value Detainees charged in U.S. v. Khalid Sheikh Mohammed, et al., in the Military Commissions at Guantanamo Bay, Cuba with conspiring to orchestrate the September 11th attacks of the World Trade Center and Pentagon. Durkin was civilian counsel for defendant Ramzi bin Alshibh.

In January 2014, Durkin represented Jared Chase, one of the NATO 3 defendants, in the first prosecution under Illinois’ terrorism statute, wherein the three defendants were acquitted on all terrorism charges.

In 2012, Durkin represented a group of University of Chicago graduate students arrested following the mass arrests of the Occupy Chicago protesters in Grant Park, Chicago.

In 2009, Durkin represented Bobby DeLaughter, the former Hinds County, Mississippi, Circuit Judge in a mail fraud case pertaining to alleged judicial misconduct.

In May, 2008, Durkin obtained an acquittal on all counts for Michael J. Mahoney, the former Executive Director of the John Howard Association, on charges of bribery involving health care contracts with the Illinois Department of Corrections.

Durkin was the lead trial counsel for Matthew F. Hale, the self-proclaimed Pontifex Maximus of the World Church of the Creator, an avowed white supremacist organization, on widely publicized domestic terrorism charges that Hale solicited the murder of U.S. District Court Judge Joan Lefkow.

He also served as co-counsel for the Global Relief Foundation, Inc., of Bridgeview, Illinois, one of the Islamic charities whose assets were blocked after September 11, 2001, under provisions of the U.S. PATRIOT Act by the Treasury Department’s Office of Foreign Assets Control

In 2017, he was one of the lawyers who made it possible for a Syrian resident doctor at a Chicago hospital to return to Chicago after being refused re-entry to the United States following his wedding as a result of E.O. 59447v.8.

References

Lawyers from Chicago
Year of birth missing (living people)
Living people